Sinochem Corporation is a Chinese state-owned multinational conglomerate primarily engaged in the production and trading of chemicals and fertilizer and exploration and production of oil for civilian and military purposes.  Its majority owned fertilizer subsidiary Sinofert is involved throughout the chain from production of the product and procurement on international markets to distribution and retail.

Sinochem Group was founded in 1950. Its predecessor was China National Chemicals Import and Export Corporation was China's largest trading firm. Sinochem Group is the key state-owned enterprise under the supervision of State-owned Assets Supervision and Administration Commission of the State Council (SASAC). Sinochem's headquarters is located in Xicheng District, Beijing.

Sinochem's core businesses include energy, agriculture, chemicals, real estate and financial service. It is one of Chinese four state oil companies, China's biggest agricultural input company (fertilizer, seed and agrochemicals), China's leading chemical service company.

Sinochem currently owns more than 300 subsidiaries inside and outside China. It controls several listed companies including Sinochem International, Sinofert and Franshion Properties, and is the largest shareholder of Far East Horizon. In June 2009, Sinochem Group established Sinochem Corporation as the vehicle for potential group IPO.

Sinochem Group is China's earliest entrant in Fortune Global 500 and has been on the list 25 times, ranking 139th in 2016. Sinochem's recent revenue in 2020 was 54.2 billion renminbi.

Corporate structure

Sinochem deals primarily in petrochemicals distribution, but also in synthetic rubber, plastics, and agrochemicals. It operates through more than 100 subsidiaries in China and abroad in concerns ranging from petroleum trading to real estate. Formerly owned directly by the Chinese government, Sinochem converted to a joint-stock company in 2009; initially it is owned by newly formed Sinochem Group (98%) and publicly traded Chinese shipping giant COSCO (2%). The move was designed to signal Sinochem's transformation to a market-oriented company.

History
Founded in 1950, it is China's largest trading company and its first multinational conglomerate.

China Import Co., Ltd. 
On March 10, 1950, in an aim to unify domestic trade, fulfill the set target of the import & export volume, lead the domestic market, strike a balance between supply and demand, and boost the recovery and development of domestic production, the central government made a decision to set up a national level foreign trade company under the leadership of the Trade Ministry. The predecessor of Sinochem,  China National Import Corporation, was formally established.

China Import & Export Co., Ltd. 
On Jan. 8, 1951, the preparation team for China National Import & Export Co was set up. The staff of the company came from China National Import Corp and its subsidiaries in North China. On Feb. 13, entrusted by the Trade Ministry, China National Import & Export Co took on the responsibility to oversee the import & export business of some Hong Kong institutions. When it was put into operation on March 1, the main task of the company was to tear down the blockade and trade embargo imposed by the West, and conduct trade with capitalist countries.

China National Chemicals Import & Export Co., Ltd. 
On Jan. 1, 1961, after restructuring of MOFTEC's affiliated administrative units and enterprises, China National Import & Export Co was changed into China National Chemicals Import & Export Corp.

China National Chemicals Import & Export Corp. 
On June 12, 1965, MOFTEC decided to standardize the names of foreign trade companies. On July 16, China National Import & Export Co was changed into China National Import & Export Corp.

Sinochem Group 
On Nov. 10, 2003, Sinochem changed its name from China National Chemicals Import & Export Corporation to Sinochem Corporation with the approval of the State Assets Administration and Supervision Commission and the State Administration for Industry and Commerce.

In August 2009, Sinochem bought the United Kingdom-based oil company Emerald Energy.

In November 2011, the company announced that it expected to raise ¥35 billion in its IPO, making it the largest IPO of the year in China and the sixth largest in the country's history. Funds from the IPO would be put towards the development of an oil refinery in Quanzhou, a port city in Fujian province.

U.S. investment prohibition 
In August 2020, the United States Department of Defense named Sinochem as one of several companies backed by the People's Liberation Army. In November 2020, Donald Trump issued an executive order prohibiting any American company or individual from owning shares in companies that the United States Department of Defense has listed as having links to the People's Liberation Army, which included Sinochem.

Subsidiaries
 China Foreign Economy and Trade Trust (100%)

References

External links

 
Government-owned companies of China
Oil companies of China
Trading companies of China
Petrochemical companies
Conglomerate companies of China
Xicheng District
Chinese brands
Chinese companies established in 1950
Manufacturing companies established in 1950
Technology companies established in 1950
Defence companies of China